Steven Rodney Lingenfelter (born June 10, 1958) is a retired American professional basketball player. A 6'9" power forward, he played collegiately at for the Minnesota Golden Gophers before transferring to South Dakota State University.

Lingenfelter played two seasons (1982–84) in the National Basketball Association (NBA) as a member of the Washington Bullets and San Antonio Spurs.  He averaged 1.0 points per game and 1.6 rebounds per game in his NBA career.

References

1958 births
Living people
American expatriate basketball people in France
American expatriate basketball people in Italy
American men's basketball players
Basket Mestre 1958 players
Basketball players from Wisconsin
Élan Béarnais players
Minnesota Golden Gophers men's basketball players
Power forwards (basketball)
San Antonio Spurs players
Small forwards
South Dakota State Jackrabbits men's basketball players
Sportspeople from Eau Claire, Wisconsin
Washington Bullets draft picks
Washington Bullets players
Wisconsin Flyers players